Dan Goldberg (born September 6, 1967) is an American former professional tennis player.

Goldberg, a left-handed player from Avon, Connecticut, played collegiate tennis in the late 1980s for the University of Michigan, where he was a three-time All-American and was named four times on the All-Big Ten team. As a sophomore in 1987 he reached the final of the NCAA singles championship, losing to Miami's Andrew Burrow. He was named Big Ten Athlete of the Year in 1988 and Big Ten Sportsman of the Year in 1989.

On the professional tour, Goldberg had a career high singles ranking of 276 in the world and was a quarter-finalist at the 1988 OTB Open in Schenectady, with wins over Jon Levine and Charles Beckman. In 1988 he also took a set off third seed and eventual runner-up Aaron Krickstein in a first round loss at the Detroit Grand Prix tournament.

He won two bronze medals, in the men's and mixed doubles, at the 1989 Maccabiah Games in Israel.

References

External links
 
 

1967 births
Living people
American male tennis players
Michigan Wolverines men's tennis players
Jewish tennis players
Jewish American sportspeople
Maccabiah Games medalists in tennis
Maccabiah Games bronze medalists for the United States
Competitors at the 1989 Maccabiah Games
Tennis people from Connecticut
People from Avon, Connecticut
21st-century American Jews